Blade Icewood  (March 14, 1977 – April 19, 2005), birth name Darnell Quincy Lindsay, was an American rapper from Detroit, Michigan. He was a member of the rap group Street Lordz. On April 19, 2005, he was fatally shot due to gang-related violence in Detroit, Michigan, United States.

Street Lord'z/Chedda Boyz/Dirty Glove Entertainment (1998–2005)
Lindsay was raised on the Eastside of Detroit in the vicinity of 7 Mile Road and Conant Ave. in the Grixdale/Conant Gardens neighborhood at his family's home at 3132 Berry Street. Later in life, he moved to Southfield and attended Southfield High School.

Blade Icewood debuted as a rapper in Detroit with a majority west side group "Street Lord'z aka Chedda Boyz on their debut album Platinum Rolees Don't Tic Toc. The group members were Yacht,Jesse James,O Dolla, Brick,Baby L,Stl Juan,Big J, TJ Da Thug,G-Rock,Fat Mike, Black,Tiffany Blade Icewood,Lil Kuz,Rook,Cashout Calhoun,K Doe (aka K Deezy),DJ Mark G,Pook, J O'Neal,Young Roy Boy,Gift Reynolds, StarrStrukk,Stl Ron-Ron. He performed with the Street Lord'z and the Eastside Chedda Boyz throughout his career.

Conflict with Eastside Chedda Boyz
The conflict over the name "Chedda Boyz" started after the formation of the rap group Eastside Chedda Boyz. After the second album released by the Street Lord'z, Platinum Masterpiece, boasted the subtitle, "Original Chedda Boyz," became  the cause of  conflict between the Street Lord'z and Chedda Boyz. Icewood released a bonus DVD with his "Stackmaster" solo album that featured an interview discussing the origins of the name Chedda Boyz. A retaliating diss song was later released by the Eastside Chedda Boyz titled "Boss Up and Take They Money" (an allusion to the Icewood song, "Boy Would You").

Shooting and paralysis
On September 20, 2004, Blade Icewood was shot in his own house in Oak Park, Michigan, a suburb of Detroit. He was hit with seven bullets from an AK-47 assault rifle, after gunmen broke into his house. After the shooting, an officer stated that Icewood refused to assist investigators. He was paralyzed from the chest down and used a wheelchair. Two days prior to his own shooting, another shooting happened outside of Candy Bar, a Woodward Avenue nightclub, that left Wipeout, a rival Eastside Detroit rapper, dead. Many speculated the shootings were related. A diss song called "Ride On Me" suggests that Icewood knew the assailants.

Death and aftermath
On April 19, 2005, Icewood was shot while he was at a car wash on West 7 Mile Road and Faust Street on the west side of Detroit. A gunman pulled up alongside his Range Rover and fired 17 rounds into the passenger's side, killing Icewood. The location where he was fatally shot was almost one mile away from where he had hosted a nonviolence rally the year prior to his death. After his death, his family founded Icewood Entertainment, a record label in his honour. On April 6, 2006, Larry Joe Davidson was sentenced to life in prison for the murder.

Discography

Albums (with Street Lord'z)
 Street Lord'z: Platinum Rolee's Don't Tic Toc (1999)
 Street Lord'z: Platinum Masterpiece (2001)
 Street Lord'z & Blade Icewood: Diamond Chain (2019)

Solo releases
 Still Spinnin' Vol. 1 (2003)
 Stackmaster (CD/DVD) (2004)
 Blood, Sweat, & Tears (2005)

See also
 List of murdered hip hop musicians
 List of homicides in Michigan

References

1977 births
2005 deaths
Underground rappers
Midwest hip hop musicians
Rappers from Detroit
Murdered African-American people
People murdered in Michigan
Deaths by firearm in Michigan
Gangsta rappers